John Thompson Shepherd (21 May 1919, Belfast, Northern Ireland – 4 October 2011, Rochester, Minnesota) was a British-American cardiologist, medical researcher in cardiovascular physiology, and medical school dean. His research on the regulation of the cardiovascular system included "classic studies on reflex control of the circulation, haemodynamic responses to heat stress and exercise, and mechanisms of vasodilation."

Biography
After graduation from Belfast's Campbell College, John T. Shepherd studied medicine at Queen's University Belfast, qualifying M.B. and B.Ch. in 1945 and M.Ch. in 1948. After completing his internship and residency at the Royal Victoria Hospital, Belfast, he became a staff member of the department of the physiology of Queen's University, Belfast. There in 1951 he received the research medical degree of M.D. He was awarded in 1953 a Fulbright Scholarship for one year to do cardiovascular research at the Mayo Clinic. He returned to Belfast in 1954 as a reader in physiology at Queen's University. In the department of physiology he had four close colleagues, namely Archibald David Mant Greenfield (1917–2005), Ian Campbell Roddie (1928–2011), Walter Ernest "Darty" Glover (1932–2017), and Robert Ford "Bob" Whelan (1922–1984), who later became deans of medical schools. In 1956 Shepherd received a D.Sc. from Queen's University Belfast. In 1957 he emigrated with his family to the United States and joined the staff of the Mayo Clinic, where he remained until his retirement in 1989.

From 1966 to 1974 he was a professor and the chair of the department of physiology and biophysics with a joint appointment at the Mayo Medical School (now named the Mayo Clinic Alix School of Medicine) and the Mayo Graduate School of Medicine.

He helped to train more than 100 research fellows. He was the author or co-author of several books and more than 300 scientific articles.

Shepherd was elected in 1951 a member of The Physiological Society and in 1977 a fellow of the Royal College of Physicians. He worked on space physiology with NASA and with scientists from the Soviet Union. From 1965 to 1974 he was the chair of the Committee on Space Medicine of the U.S. National Academy of Sciences. From 1975 to 1976 he was the president of the American Heart Association.

Two of his brothers and five among his nephews and nieces became physicians. In 1945 he married Helen Mary Johnston, who died in 1987. They had a daughter, Gillian, and a son, Roger, both of whom became physicians. Upon his death, John T. Shepherd was survived by his second wife, Marion, as well as his daughter and son from his first marriage, and "four step-children, five grandchildren, eight step-grandchildren and a great-grandson."

Selected publications

Articles

Books

References

External links
 

1919 births
2011 deaths
20th-century British medical doctors
21st-century British medical doctors
20th-century American physicians
21st-century American physicians
British cardiologists
British physiologists
American cardiologists
American physiologists
Northern Ireland emigrants to the United States
People educated at Campbell College
Alumni of Queen's University Belfast
Academics of Queen's University Belfast
Mayo Clinic people